= Nigadi =

Coordinates: 14°13′N 78°13′E

- Village
- Interactive map of Nigadi
- Country: India
- State: Karnataka
- District: Dharwad

Government
  - Type: Panchayat raj
  - Body: Gram panchayat

Population (2011)
  - Total: 2,295

Languages
  - Official: Kannada
- Time zone: UTC+5:30 (IST)
- ISO 3166 code: IN-KA
- Vehicle registration: KA
- Website: karnataka.gov.in

Nigadi is a village in Dharwad district of Karnataka, India.

== Demographics ==
As of the 2011 Census of India there were 479 households in Nigadi and a total population of 2,295 consisting of 1,193 males and 1,102 females. There were 299 children ages 0-6.
